The H B Allen Centre is the graduate centre of Keble College, one of the constituent colleges of the University of Oxford in England.

Background
The H B Allen Centre is named for Heather Barbara "Mickie" Allen, founder of the H B Allen Charitable Trust. Ms. Allen was a descendant of the founder of Beefeater Gin, James Burrough, and also donated to RNLI for lifeboats in Padstow. The trust contributed a £25 million capital grant to assist with construction and fitting out of the new site.

Construction
The centre was built on the site of the former Acland Hospital. Part of the old hospital, the Sarah Acland House, is  a Grade II listed building, and a significant challenge in construction was preserving this structure.

The H B Allen Centre was officially opened on 3 October 2019 (a year behind schedule) by Prince William, Duke of Cambridge.

Facilities
The centre includes accommodation for 230 full-time graduates, as well as common area including two multipurpose rooms, laundry facilities, a gym, a café, and lecture theatre.

References

2019 establishments in England
Residential buildings completed in 2019
Buildings and structures of the University of Oxford
Grade II listed buildings in Oxford
Grade II listed residential buildings
Halls of residence in the United Kingdom
Residential buildings in England
Keble College, Oxford